Danika Bourne (born 9 July 1981 in Brisbane) is an Australian ice dancer. With partner Alexander Pavlov, she competed at two Four Continents Championships.

Results 
(with Pavlov)

References

1981 births
Australian female ice dancers
Living people
Sportswomen from Queensland
Sportspeople from Brisbane